This page tabulates susceptibility of various salmonids to whirling disease.

Susceptibility as defined in laboratory or exposure to M. cerebralis at vulnerable life stages. Score of 0-3 or S:
0=resistant, no spores develop;
1=partial resistance, clinical disease rare and develops only when exposed to very high parasite doses.
2=susceptible, clinical disease common at high parasite doses, but greater resistance to disease at low doses.
3=highly susceptible, clinical disease common.
S=susceptibility is unclear (conflicting reports, insufficient data, lack of M. cerebralis confirmation).
Data collated by Beth MacConnell and Dick Vincent and used with permission of the Whirling Disease Initiative, which funded the study.

References 

MacConnell, E., and E. R. Vincent. 2002. Review: The effects of Myxobolus cerebralis on the salmonid host. Pages 95–107 in J. L. Bartholomew and J. C. Wilson, editors. Whirling disease: Reviews and current topics. American Fisheries Society, Symposium 29, Bethesda, Maryland.

Animal parasites of fish